Replicas of the Jewish Temple are scale models or authentic buildings that attempt to replicate the Temple of Solomon, Second Temple and Herod's Temple in Jerusalem.

Scale models

In the seventeenth century, Rabbi Jacob Judah Leon of Amsterdam (1602–1675) built a widely exhibited model of the Temple based on his understanding of the biblical specifications.

Another notable model was constructed by Gerhard Schott (1641–1702), follows an interpretation made by the Spanish Jesuit Juan Bautista Villalpando.  Schott's model, known as the Hamburg temple model, is still displayed in the Hamburg Museum in Hamburg.

Conrad Schick constructed a series of replicas of the Jewish Temple.  His replica of the Biblical Tabernacle was visited in Jerusalem by several crowned heads of state, toured the United Kingdom, and was exhibited at the 1873 Vienna World's Fair.  It was purchased by the King of Württemberg, who awarded Schick a knighthood in recognition of his work.  Schick built a replica of the contemporary Temple Mount and Dome of the Rock for the Ottoman Sultan.  His final model, in four sections, each representing the Temple Mount as it appeared in a particular  era, was exhibited at the St. Louis World's Fair of 1904.

A scale model existed at the Chachmei Lublin Yeshiva, but was destroyed during World War II. Two of Schick's models are located in the basement of the Schmidt school for girls in east Jerusalem, near the Damascus Gate.

Museums that display notable Temple models include the Bijbels Museum ("Biblical Museum") in Amsterdam, the Israel Museum in Jerusalem, which now houses the model of Jerusalem in the Late 2nd Temple Period originally constructed by archeologist Michael Avi-Yonah at the Holyland hotel, and the Yeshiva University Museum in Manhattan which has models by archaeological architect Leen Ritmeyer.  The North Visitors' Center at Temple Square, in Salt Lake City, Utah has a scale model of Jerusalem as it may have looked at the time of Christ.

Alec Garrard of Norfolk, UK, worked for 30 years creating a 1:100 scale model of Herod's Temple. His model has been recognized as the most authentic version of the temple in the world.

Palestine Park on the grounds of Chautauqua Institution in Chautauqua, New York  has a small replica of the temple, part of a living topographical map of the Holy Land, complete with the Sea of Galilee, the Jordan River,  and the Dead Sea.  Lake Chautauqua stands in for the Mediterranean.

The Holy Land Experience, a Christian theme park in Orlando, Florida that features a large replica of Herod's Temple inside the walls of a replica of the Jerusalem of Jesus' day.

Building-sized replicas of the Temple

In 2009, Jews from settlements Mitzpe Yeriho in the West Bank, began to build a life-size replica of the Temple of Jerusalem.

In 2010 the Universal Church of the Kingdom of God started the construction of a  replica of Solomon's temple in São Paulo, Brazil. According to local press reports, the building would be an "exact replica" of the ancient Temple of Solomon, but with increased dimensions, despite resembling considerably more Herod's Temple. The temple was inaugurated in July 2014. The mega-church seats 10,000 worshipers and stands 180 feet tall, the height of an 18-story building.

Buildings evoking the Temple

A number of churches and synagogues have been designed to evoke the Temple. The most famous of them is the Escorial Palace Monastery in Spain (1563–1584), by architect Juan Bautista de Toledo under the order of Philip II of Spain.  The central axis reveals a pattern of courtyard, sanctuary, Holy of Holies.

The Old Whalers Church in Sag Harbor, New York was built in 1844 by architect Minard Lafever as a replica of the Temple.<ref name=Landy>"The Architecture of Minard Lafever, Jacob Landy New York, Columbia University Press, 1970, pp. 230, 287.</ref>

The 1906 building of Temple Israel (Boston, Massachusetts) was intended to be a replica of the Temple.  The Church of St. Polyeuctus in Constantinople was built with the precise proportions given in the Bible for the Temple of Solomon.

The 1909 building of the Herzliya Hebrew High School in Tel Aviv,  designed by Joseph Barsky, was intended to evoke Solomon's Temple following a widely circulated reconstruction of the temple by Charles Chipiez.

All LDS temples are evocations of the Temple of Solomon. The Salt Lake Temple of the Church of Jesus Christ of Latter-day Saints is oriented towards Jerusalem and the large basin used as a baptismal font is mounted on the backs of twelve oxen, as was the brazen sea of Solomon's Temple.
The Cardston Alberta, Laie Hawaii, and Mesa Arizona Temples of the Church of Jesus Christ of Latter-day Saints are all designed after the style of the second temple built by King Herod.

The Masonic Temples bear a similar symbolism: Solomon's Temple is a central symbol of Freemasonry, which holds that the first three Grand Masters were King Solomon, King Hiram I of Tyre, and Hiram Abiff – the craftsman/architect who built the temple.  Masonic initiation rites include the reenactment of a scene set on the Temple Mount while it was under construction. Every Masonic Lodge, therefore, is symbolically the Temple for the duration of the degree, and possesses ritual objects representing the architecture of the Temple. These may either be built into the hall or be portable.  Among the most prominent are replicas of the pillars Boaz and Jachin through which every initiate has to pass.

Replicas in the form of the Dome of the Rock

It was long mistakenly believed by Europeans that the Dome of the Rock had been built as an architectural replica of the Temple. A number of buildings were  designed as replicas of the Temple in the shape of the Dome of the Rock. Many of these buildings are linked to the Temple Knights who had the nearby Al Aqsa Mosque as their Jerusalem headquarters. These replicas include the octagonal, fifteenth-century  Church of St. Giacomo in Italy, and the octagonal,  nineteenth-century Moorish Revival style Rumbach Street synagogue in Budapest.

Perugino's Marriage of the Virgin and Raphael's The Marriage of the Virgin both show the Temple as a Renaissance version of the Dome of the Rock.

Replicas of the tabernacle

The Glencairn Museum in Bryn Athyn, Pennsylvania  a replica of the biblical tabernacle dating from 1922.  The Mennonite Information Center in Lancaster, Pennsylvania had a replica dating from the 1940s."Rising up; Tabernacle replica in Gordonville fixed after storm", Lancaster New Era, Lancaster, June 15, 2002,: Joan Kern

The Mishkan Shiloh'' synagogue in Shilo, Mateh Binyamin is designed as a replica of the Tabernacle.

In Israel, Timna Valley Park and Kibbutz Almog  feature full-scale replicas.

References

Tabernacle and Temples in Jerusalem
Jewish Temple

Jewish Temple